Gu Byeong-mo (Hangul 구병모; born 1976) is a South Korean writer. She made her literary debut in 2009 when her novel Wizard Bakery (위저드 베이커리 Wizard Bakery) won the 2nd Changbi Prize for Young Adult Fiction. Her 2015 short story collection Geugeosi namaneun anigireul (그것이 나만은 아니기를 I Hope It's Not Just Me) received the Today's Writer Award and Hwang Sun-won New Writers' Award. She penned the novels Pigeumallion aideul (피그말리온 아이들 The Pygmalion Children), Agami (아가미 Gills), and Bangjuro oseyo (방주로 오세요 Come to Bangju) as well as the short story collection Gouineun anijiman (고의는 아니지만 I Didn't Mean to But). Gu's debut novel Wijeodeu Beikeori was translated into Spanish by Minjeong Jeong and Irma Zyanja Gil Yáñez. They received the 24th Daesan Literary Award in 2016 for their translation.

Life 
Gu Byeong-mo was born in Seoul, South Korea in 1976. Gu studied Korean literature at Kyung Hee University.

Writing 
Many of Gu Byeong-mo's works are genre fiction. Her debut novel Wijeodeu beikeori (위저드 베이커리 Wizard Bakery) mixes mystery, horror, and fantasy. It is the first young adult novel in South Korea to employ magic as a major plot device, breaking the convention of the genre to deal with only realistic settings. The judges of the Changbi Prize for Young Adult Fiction chose Wijeodeu as the winner because it is a fantastical allegory that deviates from the standard coming-of-age story set in schools.

Gu's later works are also allegories that use unusual motifs to reveal a dark side of reality. “Hwagapsonyeojeon” (화갑소녀전 Tale of the Match Girl) is a short story based on “The Little Match Girl” by Hans Christian Andersen. But instead of seeing wonderful visions in the glow of her matches, the protagonist only sees scenes of horror and tragedy. The story urges readers to question commonly accepted truths or lessons and to view the world in a new light.

Works 
 심장에 수놓은 이야기 A Story Embroided In The Heart (2020)
 버드 스트라이크 Bird Strike (2019)
 단 하나의 문장 The One Sentence (2018)
 네 이웃의 식탁 Your Neighbor’s Table (2018)
 한 스푼의 시간 A Spoonful of Time (2016)
 빨간구두당 The Red Shoes Party (2015)
 그것이 나만은 아니기를 May It Not Be Just Me (2015)
 파과 Damaged Fruit (2013)
 파란 아이 Blue Child (2013)
 피그말리온 아이들 The Pygmalion Children (2012)
 방주로 오세요 Come to Bangju (2012)
 고의는 아니지만 I Didn’t Mean to But (2011)
 아가미 Gills (2011)
 위저드 베이커리 Wizard Bakery (2009)

Works in Translation (partial) 
 The Old Woman with the Knife (English)
 La panadería encantada (Spanish)
 Fils de l'eau (French)
 AZALEA (Journal of Korean Literature & Culture) : Volume Ten (English)

Awards 
 2016: Daesan Literary Award, translation category
 2015: Today's Writer Award
 2015: Hwang Sun-won New Writers' Award
 2009: Changbi Prize for Young Adult Fiction

References

External links 
 The Wizard Bakery Book Trailer (English)
 The Wizard Bakery Book Trailer (Spanish)
 The Wizard Bakery excerpt (English) 
 Interview (Spanish) at the Guadalajara International Book Fair
 Learning to Breathe: Greatest Fish by Gu Byeong-mo
 LTI Korea Attends the 2015 Guadalajara International Book Fair
 Korean novel enthralls Mexican young adults

South Korean women novelists
South Korean novelists
1976 births
People from Seoul
Living people
Kyung Hee University alumni